Monte San Pietro is a comune (municipality) in the Metropolitan City of Bologna in the Italian region Emilia-Romagna, located about  southwest of Bologna.  

Monte San Pietro borders the following municipalities: Marzabotto, Sasso Marconi, Valsamoggia, Zola Predosa.

References

External links
 Official website

Cities and towns in Emilia-Romagna